The Bee Family (formerly the Eh Bee Family) are Canadian internet personalities best known for their Vine, YouTube, and Instagram channels, which have over 9 million combined subscribers and well over 2 billion total views They are aged 44, 43, 17, and 16 years old. They create skits and parodies to entertain a family-centered audience. They are a family of four based in Thornhill, Ontario consisting of the father (Andrés Burgos, known as Papa Bee), the mother (Rossana Burgos, known as Mama Bee), their son (Roberto Burgos, known as Mr Monkey or Mr Bee), and their daughter (Gabriela Rossana Burgos, also known as Gabriela Bee or Miss Monkey).

Career 
The Bee Family first started posting vines in January 2013. They became popular on Vine and made it their career. Their social media accounts include Vine, YouTube, Instagram, and Facebook. They have also starred in sponsored advertisements for such companies as Johnson & Johnson, Toyota, and Regal Cinemas and have also been featured in the New York Daily News, on BuzzFeed, Good Morning America, Today.com, and other media outlets. The family's social media was nominated for a Streamy Award in 2015 and a Shorty Award in 2016. On February 17, 2018, Gabriela Bee released her song "Sound in Color". On September 1, 2018, Gabriela Bee released another song, "Something More".

In April 2019, posted a cover version of the Beatles’ 1968 hit song Ob-La-Di, Ob-La-Da on YouTube, appearing in the video as seven different musicians and performing all of the vocals by herself. By January 2023, the song had earned more than 37 million views.

On July 15, 2020, the family changed their name from the "Eh Bee Family" to "The Bee Family".

References

External links 
 Official Website
 Eh Bee family Facebook video with more than 100 million views

Living people
Vine (service) celebrities
Canadian YouTubers
Canadian families
Year of birth missing (living people)
YouTube channels launched in 2013
YouTube vloggers
Canadian YouTube groups